Ronald Agénor defeated Alexander Volkov 4–6, 6–4, 7–6(10–8) in the final to secure the title.

Seeds

  Goran Ivanišević (second round)
  Jonas Svensson (quarterfinals)
  Magnus Gustafsson (first round)
  Horst Skoff (second round)
  Petr Korda (second round)
  Ronald Agénor '(champion)
  Franco Davín (first round)  Alexander Volkov (final)''

Draws

Key
Q - Qualifier
WC - Wild card
LL - Lucky loser

Finals

Section 1

Section 2

External links
 1990 Berlin Open Draw

European Indoor Championships